Ilyas Turamirzayevich Muminov (born 7 November 2001) is a Russian football player who plays for FC SKA-Khabarovsk.

Club career
He made his debut in the Russian Football National League for FC Spartak-2 Moscow on in a game against FC Baltika Kaliningrad.

References

External links
 
 Profile by Russian Football National League
 

2001 births
Footballers from Saint Petersburg
Living people
Russian footballers
Russia youth international footballers
Association football midfielders
FC Spartak-2 Moscow players
FC SKA-Khabarovsk players
Russian First League players
Russian Second League players